Julián López may refer to:

Sportspeople
Julián López Escobar (born 1982), Spanish bullfighter
Julián López (footballer, born 1987), Spanish footballer
Julián López (footballer, born 2000), Argentine footballer

Other
 (born 1945), Spanish bishop for Roman Catholic Diocese of León in Spain
Julián López (comedian) (born 1978), Spanish actor in La hora chanante

See also
Júlio López (disambiguation)
Julia López (disambiguation)